

Cuttlefish Bay  is a locality in the Australian state of South Australia located on the north coast of Dudley Peninsula on Kangaroo Island overlooking Backstairs Passage about  south of the state capital of Adelaide and about  east of Penneshaw.  Its boundaries were created in March 2002 while its name was derived from Cuttlefish Bay, a bay located on its coastline with Backstairs Passage.  Land use within the locality is concerned with agriculture while land adjoining the coastline has additional statutory constraints to “conserve the natural features of the coast.”  Cuttlefish Bay is located within the federal division of Mayo, the state electoral district of Mawson and the local government area of the Kangaroo Island Council.

References
Notes

Citations

Towns on Kangaroo Island
Dudley Peninsula